The  is a toll road in Chiba Prefecture, Japan. It is owned and operated by East Nippon Expressway Company.

Overview

Officially the road is designated as National Route 126.

The road consists of two distinct sections. The first section (Chiba-higashi Junction to Tōgane Interchange) was opened in 1979 and connects the prefectural capital Chiba with the city of Tōgane. It is 4 lanes for its entire length.

The second section (Tōgane Interchange to Matsuo-Yokoshiba Interchange) was opened in 1998 and is 2 lanes. This section is designed to become part of the future Ken-Ō Expressway. The expressway will extend south beyond Tōgane Interchange (expected to open in 2009-2010) and north beyond Matsuo-Yokoshiba Interchange (route is currently under assessment).

Electronic Toll Collection (ETC) is accepted, however no discount programs are in effect.

List of interchanges and features

 IC - interchange, JCT - junction, PA - parking area

References

External links

 East Nippon Expressway Company

Regional High-Standard Highways in Japan
Toll roads in Japan
Roads in Chiba Prefecture